Vierset Castle is a castle in Vierset-Barse, municipality of Modave, Wallonia, Belgium.

See also
List of castles in Belgium

External links
 
 

Castles in Belgium
Castles in Liège Province